The Cabinet of Vilhelm Buhl II, also popularly known as the Liberation Cabinet, was the government of Denmark from May 5, 1945 until November 7 same year. It got its alternative name because it was the first government after the liberation from the Nazi German occupation during World War II.

It comprised 18 ministers, about evenly split between the former Danish unity government, and members of the Frihedsrådet and other resistance groups.

List of ministers
The cabinet consisted of:

|}

References

1945 establishments in Denmark
1945 disestablishments in Denmark
Cabinets disestablished in 1945
Buhl, Vilhelm 2